Bruno dos Santos Moraes (born 7 July 1984) is a Brazilian footballer who plays as a striker.

He spent most of his professional career in Portugal, starting in 2003 with Porto.

Club career
Born in Santos, São Paulo, Moraes arrived at only 19 to FC Porto in Portugal, from Santos FC. His career with the northern club would be marred by constant injuries – he made two Primeira Liga appearances in his debut season, and none whatsoever in 2005–06 and 2007–08.

Moraes' most productive season at Porto came in the 2006–07 campaign, as the Dragons won the national championship for the second year running. He appeared in 18 matches and scored three goals across the domestic league and the UEFA Champions League, notably taking part in both group-stage fixtures against Hamburger SV and netting in the second, a 3–1 away win 1 in November 2006.

Moraes spent 2004–05 on loan to Vitória de Setúbal, where he appeared regularly, and started 2008–09 on loan with the same team, but the second spell was soon cut short due to injury. In January 2010, with a contract running until June, he returned to Porto, trying to persuade manager Jesualdo Ferreira to add him to the squad of the four-time national champions; he did not and was loaned one more time, now to Rio Ave F.C. of the same league.

In mid-February 2011, Moraes signed for Associação Naval 1º de Maio also in Portugal. He featured regularly during his four-month spell in Figueira da Foz, but they could not finally avoid top-flight relegation. In July, after an aborted transfer to Al Ahly SC in Egypt, he joined another Portuguese top-tier side, U.D. Leiria, meeting the same fate at the end of the season.

On 8 October 2012, Moraes moved clubs and countries again, signing a one-year deal with Újpest FC in Hungary. In July 2015, after totalling only 11 games for Gil Vicente F.C. and Associação Portuguesa de Desportos, he joined Varzim S.C. of the Portuguese Segunda Liga.

Personal life
Moraes' younger brother, Júnior Moraes, was also a footballer and a striker. He too represented Santos as a senior, as well as Gloria Bistriţa. Their father also played for that club as well as Clube de Regatas do Flamengo, whilst a sister ended her career early on due to injury. Moraes' mother won the São Paulo State tennis championship.

Honours
Porto
Primeira Liga: 2003–04, 2006–07
UEFA Champions League: 2003–04

Vitória Setúbal
Taça de Portugal: 2004–05

References

External links

1984 births
Living people
Sportspeople from Santos, São Paulo
Brazilian footballers
Association football forwards
Campeonato Brasileiro Série A players
Campeonato Brasileiro Série B players
Santos FC players
Associação Portuguesa de Desportos players
Primeira Liga players
Liga Portugal 2 players
Segunda Divisão players
FC Porto B players
FC Porto players
Vitória F.C. players
Rio Ave F.C. players
Associação Naval 1º de Maio players
U.D. Leiria players
Gil Vicente F.C. players
Varzim S.C. players
S.C. Espinho players
C.D. Trofense players
Liga I players
ACF Gloria Bistrița players
Nemzeti Bajnokság I players
Újpest FC players
Cypriot Second Division players
Enosis Neon Paralimni FC players
Brazilian expatriate footballers
Expatriate footballers in Portugal
Expatriate footballers in Romania
Expatriate footballers in Hungary
Expatriate footballers in Cyprus
Brazilian expatriate sportspeople in Portugal
Brazilian expatriate sportspeople in Romania
Brazilian expatriate sportspeople in Hungary
Brazilian expatriate sportspeople in Cyprus